In theoretical physics, fine-tuning is the process in which parameters of a model must be adjusted very precisely in order to fit with certain observations. This had led to the discovery that the fundamental constants and quantities fall into such an extraordinarily precise range that if it did not, the origin and evolution of conscious agents in the universe would not be permitted.

Theories requiring fine-tuning are regarded as problematic in the absence of a known mechanism to explain why the parameters happen to have precisely the observed values that they return. The heuristic rule that parameters in a fundamental physical theory should not be too fine-tuned is called naturalness.

Background  
The idea that naturalness will explain fine tuning was brought into question by Nima Arkani-Hamed, a theoretical physicist, in his talk "Why is there a Macroscopic Universe?", a lecture from the mini-series "Multiverse & Fine Tuning" from the "Philosophy of Cosmology" project, a University of Oxford and Cambridge Collaboration 2013. In it he describes how naturalness has usually provided a solution to problems in physics; and that it had usually done so earlier than expected. However, in addressing the problem of the cosmological constant, naturalness has failed to provide an explanation though it would have been expected to have done so a long time ago.

The necessity of fine-tuning leads to various problems that do not show that the theories are incorrect, in the sense of falsifying observations, but nevertheless suggest that a piece of the story is missing. For example, the cosmological constant problem (why is the cosmological constant so small?); the hierarchy problem; and the strong CP problem, among others.

Also, Dongshan He's team has suggested a possible solution for the fine tuned Cosmological constant by the universe creation from nothing model.

Example 
An example of a fine-tuning problem considered by the scientific community to have a plausible "natural" solution is the cosmological flatness problem, which is solved if inflationary theory is correct: inflation forces the universe to become very flat, answering the question of why the universe is today observed to be flat to such a high degree.

Measurement 
Although fine-tuning was traditionally measured by ad hoc fine-tuning measures, such as the Barbieri-Giudice-Ellis measure, over the past decade many scientists recognized that fine-tuning arguments were a specific application of Bayesian statistics.

See also
 Anthropic principle
 Fine-tuned universe
 Hierarchy problem
 Strong CP problem

References 

Chaos theory
Theoretical physics